Bethlehem is the eighth studio album by garage rock band The Original Sins, released in 1996 through Bar/None Records. The album shows a change in tone for the band, focusing much more on pop music and psychedelic rock than the energetic garage punk fury from previous releases. The album has been considered as the band's best, with some describing it as "the band's greatest achievement" and a "great leap-forward".

Track listing

Personnel

Performers
John Terlesky - Vocals, guitar, percussion
Ken Bussiere - Bass
Dave McKinney - Organ, piano
Seth Baer - Drums
Maria Stoiancheff - Backing vocals
Josh Silverman - Acoustic guitar ("Beautiful Day"), guitar ("Sunday Nights")
Ray Ketchum - Backing vocals, percussion (""One Way Out")
Reneé LaBue - Handclaps

Production
Elizabeth Van Itallie - Design
Ray Ketchum - Production
Dan Delong - Photography
John Terlesky - Photography

References

1996 albums
The Original Sins albums